De domo may refer to:

In Polish tradition, de domo is an indicator of a woman's maiden name, similar to the French term née
De Domo, a treatise by Lucian of Samosata
, Cicero's  Oratio De Domo Sua Ad Pontifices